Franquelis Antonio Osoria (born September 12, 1981) is a retired Major League Baseball pitcher.

Career
Osoria made his Major League Baseball debut with the Los Angeles Dodgers on June 7, . In December , he was claimed off waivers by the Pittsburgh Pirates. After spending most of the season with the Pirates' Triple-A club in Indianapolis, going 2-5 with a 2.63 ERA in 39 games as a reliever, he was called up by the Pirates on August 4, . On July 31, he was designated for assignment after the Pirates traded Jason Bay for four players. On November 30, 2008, he signed a minor league contract with the Kansas City Royals.

Like fellow reliever Antonio Alfonseca, Osoria has an extra digit on his throwing hand.

References

External links

1981 births
Living people
Águilas Cibaeñas players
Dominican Republic expatriate baseball players in the United States
Indianapolis Indians players
Jacksonville Suns players
Las Vegas 51s players

Los Angeles Dodgers players
Major League Baseball pitchers
Major League Baseball players from the Dominican Republic
Pittsburgh Pirates players
South Georgia Waves players
Vero Beach Dodgers players
Estrellas Orientales players
Gigantes del Cibao players